Helen Behan is an Irish actress. Her most notable roles include  This Is England '88 and The Virtues. Behan was named as one of Screen International's  Stars of Tomorrow 2020.

Early life and career
Behan is from Laytown, County Meath, Ireland. During her student days in college, Behan attended part-time acting courses at the Gaiety Theatre, Dublin.

Career
After a chance meeting in a pub, Shane Meadows invited Behan to audition for a part in the film  This Is England '88, where she landed the role of Evelyn, nurse and later friend to Lol Jenkins (Vicky McClure). In 2019, Behan played the role of Anna, sister of Joseph (Stephen Graham) in The Virtues for which she received a nomination as Best supporting actress at the 2020 BAFTA TV awards.

Behan was named as one of Screen International's  Stars of Tomorrow 2020, which showcases talent within the TV & film industry of Great Britain and Ireland.

In 2020, Behan starred in the Cathy Brady directed Irish drama thriller film Wildfire alongside Danika McGuigan and Nora-Jane Noone. In 2021, she took on a main role of police psychologist Tory Snow, in the Swedish supernatural psychological thriller series The Box, co-starring Anna Friel and Peter Stormare.   

in 2022, Behan played the role of Abigail Ross in thr ITV miniseries Holding, a four part adaptation of Graham Norton's bestselling novel. In 2023, Behan portrayed Monica Nolan in the Dublin sleuth film Barber alongside the protagonist played by Aidan Gillen.

Personal life
Behan is married with four children; Her husband supported her move away from nursing into acting; During the COVID-19 outbreak she returned to her previous vocation.

Filmography

Film

Television

Awards and nominations

References

External links

Helen Behan interview at Culture Club feature, Today FM

Living people
21st-century Irish actresses
Actors from County Meath
Irish television actresses
Irish film actresses
Year of birth missing (living people)